Azhdeha Baluch (also Romanized as Azhdehā Balūch) is a village in Aliabad-e Ziba Kenar Rural District, Lasht-e Nesha District, Rasht County, Gilan Province, Iran. At the 2006 census, its population was 256, in 83 families.

References 

Populated places in Rasht County